Paul Johnson (born 29 April 1962) is  a former Australian rules footballer who played with North Melbourne in the Victorian Football League (VFL).

Notes

External links 		
		
		
		
		
		

1962 births
Living people
Australian rules footballers from Victoria (Australia)		
North Melbourne Football Club players